Todd Brost (born September 23, 1967) is a former Canadian ice hockey player and head coach.

As a player, he won a silver medal playing with Team Canada at the 1992 Winter Olympics.

Brost has been a head coach in the WPHL with the El Paso Buzzards (1996–2000), and in the UHL with the Elmira Jackals (2000–05). He won the WPHL's Coach of the Year award for the 1996–97 season.

Awards and honours

Career statistics

Regular season and playoffs

International

References

External links

1967 births
Huntington Blizzard players
Ice hockey players at the 1992 Winter Olympics
Living people
Olympic ice hockey players of Canada
Olympic silver medalists for Canada
Olympic medalists in ice hockey
Medalists at the 1992 Winter Olympics
Michigan Wolverines men's ice hockey players
Penticton Knights players
Ice hockey people from Calgary
Phoenix Cobras players
Canadian ice hockey centres